This is a list of Spanish television related events from 1960.

Events
 25 January - Live Theatre show Gran Teatro debuts with the play, En Flandes se ha puesto el sol by Eduardo Marquina.
 18 May - TVE broadcasts the final of the 1959–60 European Cup between Real Madrid and Eintracht Frankfurt.
 15 December: Life broadcasting by TVE of Baudouin of Belgium y the spaniard Fabiola de Mora y Aragón wedding, commented by Eduardo Sancho and Federico Gallo, becomes quite an event in the country.

Debuts

Television shows
Telediario (1957- )
 Fila cero (1958-1962)
 Pantalla deportiva (1959-1963) 	
 Fiesta brava (1959-1964) 	
 Gran parada (1959-1964) 	
 Teatro de familia (1959-1965) 	
 Primer aplauso (1959-1966) 	
 Tengo un libro en las manos (1959-1966)

Ending this year
 Teatro Apolo (158-1960)
 Club Miramar (1959-1960)	
 Galería de esposas (1959-1960) 	
 Galería de maridos (1959-1960) 	
 Hogar, dulce hogar (1959-1960) 	
 Palma y Don Jaime (1959-1960)

Foreign series debuts in Spain 
 The New Adventures of Charlie Chan (Charlie Chan)
 Fury
 Huckleberry Hound
 Jungle Jim (Jim de la selva)
 Lassie (La perra Lassie)
 Whirlybirds (Pájaros de acero)
 Perry Mason. 
 The Life of Riley(Viviendo con Riley)

Births
 1 January - Francis Lorenzo, host and actor.
 1 February - Mariano Peña, actor
 23 February - Luisa Martín, actress
 26 February  - Kiko Matamoros, pundit
 2 April - Luis Fernando Alvés, actor
 22 April - José Antonio Abellán, host
 7 May - Kim Manning, actress
 8 May - Jorge Roelas, actor.
 28 May  - Pastora Vega, actress and hostess
 6 June  - Lola Forner, actress
 20 June  - Alessandro Lecquio, pundit
 29 July  - J.J. Santos, sport journalist
 11 August  - Carlos Sobera, host
 15 September  - Carmen Conesa, actress
 21 September  - César Cadaval, comedian
 4 October  - Ramón Pellicer, journalist
 8 October  - Lorenzo Milá, host
 7 December  - Violeta Cela, actress
 12 December - Lydia Lozano, journalist
 Elena Markínez, journalist
 Eva Nasarre, hostess

See also
1960 in Spain
List of Spanish films of 1960

References